Raidou  may refer to:
Raidou (Dead or Alive), a character of Dead or Alive series
Raidou Kuzunoha XIV, the protagonist of Devil Summoner: Raidou Kuzunoha series, the spin-off of Shin Megami Tensei franchises